Boku no Ude no Naka de (僕の腕の中で) is the sixth single by Kiyotaka Sugiyama, released by VAP on April 21, 1988. Both the A-side and the B-Side, "Ano Sora mo. Kono Umi mo." (あの空も。この海も。) charted on the Oricon charts at No. 2, as well as appearing on The Best Ten at No. 6.

The song was not meant to be a single, but since the song was used by Japan Airlines for their commercials, it was made into one with differences from the original song. The original that was aired with the commercials has not been made available. Since the song was at a higher pitched, Sugiyama confessed that he sometimes lip synced the words when performing on TV.

Track listing

Charts

Weekly charts

Year-end charts

References 

1988 songs
1988 singles
Japanese pop songs